The 1938 Campeonato Nacional de Fútbol Profesional was Chilean first tier’s 6th season.  Magallanes was the tournament’s champion, returning to its triumphant path that led them to win three consecutive titles between 1933 and 1935.

Scores

Standings

Topscorer

References

External links
ANFP 
RSSSF Chile 1938

Primera División de Chile seasons
Primera
Chile